The Ten Abominations (十惡) were a list of offenses under traditional Chinese law which were regarded as the most abhorrent, and which threatened the well-being of civilized society.  They are listed below. The first three were capital offences:
 Plotting rebellion (謀反): to overthrow the current regime. The commentary states: "The ruler or parent has no harbours [from plots]. If he does have such plots, he must put them to death." This means that if one harbours rebellious thoughts against the ruler or father, he must then put them to death.
 Plotting great sedition (謀大逆): to damage or destroy royal temples, tumuli, or palaces. The ancient Chinese belief in feng shui equated intentional damaging of royal property with casting a curse on the sovereign. This type of person breaks laws and destroys order and goes contrary to virtue.
 Plotting treason (謀叛): to defect to an enemy state, usually carrying national secrets.
 Parricide (惡逆): to harm or murder one's own parents and grandparents; to murder one's own or husband's elder relatives.
 Depravity (不道): to murder three or more innocent people; to disembowel a victim's body after committing a murder; to produce gu and use it to cast curses.
 Great irreverence (大不敬): Lèse-majesté; to show disrespect to the Emperor or his family.
 Lack of filial piety (不孝): to maltreat one's parents or grandparents, or to procure entertainment during periods of mourning (up to three years for one's parents).
 Discord (不睦): to harm or sue one's husband or elder relatives.
 Unrighteousness (不義): petty treason; to murder one's superiors, mentor, or local government officials.
 Incest (內亂): actually defined as having affairs with the wives or concubines of one's father, grandfather, or other elder male relatives.

During the Ming Dynasty, regal privileges, such as the Eight Deliberations, were not applicable to the Ten Abominations due to their seriousness.

References 

Legal history of China
Incest
Treason